The siege of Paysandú began on 3 December 1864, during the Uruguayan War, when Brazilian forces (under the Marquis of Tamandaré) and Colorado forces (under Venancio Flores) attempted to capture the city of Paysandú in Uruguay from its Uruguayan Army defenders.  The siege ended on 2 January 1865, when the Brazilian and Colorado forces conquered the town.

Siege 
By 3 December 1864 the Brazilian navy enforced a blockade of Paysandú with one corvette and four gunboats.  The besieged garrison had 1,254 men and 15 cannons, under the command of Colonel Leandro Gómez. The Brazilians had 1,695 infantrymen, 195 artillerymen, 320 navy personnel (for a total of 2,210 men) and 30 cannons. The Colorados deploying 800 infantrymen and 7 cannons (3 of which were rifled). Colonel Gómez declined an offer to surrender.  

From 6 December until 8 December, the Brazilians and Colorados made attempts to storm the town, advancing through the streets, but were unable to take it. Tamandaré and Flores decided to await Brazil's Army of the South.

Meanwhile, Uruguay sent General  with 3,000 men and 4 cannons to relieve the besieged town.  The Brazilians and Colorados briefly lift their siege while dealing with this new threat. Saá abandoned his advance before encountering the enemy force, and fled north of the Río Negro.

On 29 December, Field Marshal  Army of the South reached Paysandú, with two infantry brigades and one artillery regiment under Lieutenant Colonel ; while Brazilian cavalry established camp a few kilometers away.  Meanwhile, in Paysandú commander Gómez beheaded forty Colorados and fifteen Brazilian prisoners and "hung their still-dripping heads above his trenches in full view of their compatriots".

On 31 December, Brazilians and Colorados recommenced their attack, and after a bitter struggle overran the city's defenses on 2 January 1865.

Aftermath
The Brazilians captured Gómez and handed him over to the Colorados. Colonel Gregorio "Goyo" Suárez shot Gómez and three of his officers. "Suárez's actions were not really unexpected, as several members of his immediate family had fallen victim to Gómez's wrath against the Colorados."

The Church of Paysandú was severely damaged at the end of the siege.

References

Citations

Bibliography

 
 
 
 
 
 
 
 
 
 
 
 
 
 
 
 
 
 
 
 
 Alves, J. V. Portella Ferreira. Mallet, o Patrono da Artilharia. Rio de Janeiro: Biblioteca do Exército, 1979. 
 Maia, João do Prado. A Marinha de Guerra do Brasil na Colônia e no Império. 2 ed. Rio de Janeiro: Livraria Editora Cátedra, 1975. 

Military history of Uruguay
Military history of Brazil
Paysandu
December 1864 events
January 1865 events
Battles of the Uruguayan War